"Wild-Eyed Dream" is the debut song recorded by American country music artist Ricky Van Shelton.  It was released in November 1986 as the first single and title track from the album Wild-Eyed Dream.  The song reached #24 on the Billboard Hot Country Singles & Tracks chart.  The song was written by Alan Rhody.

Chart performance

References

1986 debut singles
1986 songs
Ricky Van Shelton songs
Song recordings produced by Steve Buckingham (record producer)
Columbia Records singles